Anthony Uchenna Ubesie (22 February 1950 — 11 February 1994) was a Nigerian novelist, poet, playwright, broadcaster, educator, community leader, actor, and producer. He is widely known as one of the pioneers of early Igbo literature.

Life and career 
Ubesie was born in Achị in Enugu state on 22 February 1950. He studied Linguistics and Nigerian Languages specializing in the Igbo language at the University of Nigeria, Nsukka from 1976 to 1980. Prior to that, he worked as a farmer and translator for primary and secondary schools. He translated books that was written in English language to Igbo language. He died on 11 February 1994 as a result of a car accident, and according to speculations, he had many unpublished titles.

Bibliography 
According to BBC Igbo
 Ụkwa ruo oge ya ọ daa (1973)
 Isi akwụ dara n'ala (1973)
 Mmiri ọkụ e ji egbu ibe (1974)
 Ụkpana okpoko buuru (1975)
 Ụkpaka mịịrị onye ụbịam (1975)
 Jụọ Obinna (1976)
 Okokporo (1988)

References 

Igbo novelists
Nigerian novelists
Igbo-language writers